Michal Novotný (born 1 July 1981 in Prague) is a Czech snowboarder. He competed in the men's snowboard cross event at the 2006 Winter Olympics, placing thirteenth, and the 2010 Winter Olympics, placing sixteenth.

References

1985 births
Living people
Sportspeople from Prague
Czech male snowboarders
Olympic snowboarders of the Czech Republic
Snowboarders at the 2006 Winter Olympics
Snowboarders at the 2010 Winter Olympics
Universiade gold medalists for the Czech Republic
Universiade medalists in snowboarding
Competitors at the 2003 Winter Universiade